Frederick Hill Meserve (1865 – 1962) was a businessman and collector of photographs. He published a large collection of early American photographic portraits. In 1944 he worked with historian Carl Sandburg to publish 100 photographs of Abraham Lincoln. The Library of Congress has his photographic publishings in its collection.

His father  William Neal Meserve was a veteran of the American Civil War and kept a diary. Dorothy née Meserve Kunhardt was his daughter.

References

External links
Findagrave entry

1865 births
1962 deaths
20th-century American businesspeople